Helen Marie Darling (born August 29, 1978) is an American former professional basketball player, who played most recently for the San Antonio Silver Stars of the Women's National Basketball Association (WNBA).

In her WNBA career, Darling has more than 1,000 career points, 650 assists and 250 career steals and has appeared in 19 career WNBA playoff games.

Early life 
Darling is the daughter of Patricia Smith and Donald Darling. She has three brothers Donald, Ronald and Dewand Darling and one sister, Alicia Smith. She is also the mother of triplets two boys Ja-Juan, Jalen and a girl Nevaeh, born on April 13, 2002.

Darling attended Brookhaven High School (Columbus, Ohio) where she  was named a High School All-American by the WBCA. She participated in the WBCA  High School All-America Game in 1995, scoring six points.

Over the course of her college career at Penn State, Darling averaged 10.3 points, 5.3 rebounds, 6.3 assists and 2.49 steals in 126 games and is the only player in Penn State history to amass 1,000 points, 500 rebounds and 600 assists for her career. Darling is also the only player in Penn State history to earn Big Ten Player of the Year honors. A four-year starting point guard, she helped lead the Penn State Lady Lions to their first and only Final Four appearance in 2000. Darling earned her degree in education from Penn State in December 2001. She received the Frances Pomeroy Naismith Award from the Women's Basketball Coaches Association as the best senior player under 5 ft 8 in (1.7 m) in 2000.

Penn State statistics

Source

USA Basketball

Darling played on the team presenting the US at the 1999 World University Games held in Palma de Mallorca, Spain. The team had a 4–2 record and earned the silver medal. Darling scored 2.5 points per game.

WNBA career

Cleveland Rockers 
On April 25, 2000, Darling was drafted by the Cleveland Rockers in the second round (No. 17 overall) of the 2000 WNBA Draft. In her rookie season, Darling played in all 32 regular season games recording 4.8 points, 2.0 assists and 1.15 steals. For the playoffs she averaged 5.5 points, 3.3 rebounds and 2.2 assists in six Rockers playoff games.
During the 2001 WNBA season, Darling was one of only two Rockers players to start all 32 regular season games helping the Rockers earn the No.1 seed in the Eastern Conference. Darling finished the season averaging 6.1 points, 2.4 rebounds, 3.4 assists and 1.1 steals. In the three games against Charlotte during the playoffs, Darling averaged 6.0 points, 6.3 assists, 3.7 rebounds and 2.3 steals.

During the 2002 WNBA season, Darling did not play due to pregnancy.

During the 2003 WNBA season, Darling started all 34 games for Cleveland finishing the season with 128 assists, the second-highest single-season total in Rockers history and averaging 4.1 points, 3.8 assists, 2.6 rebounds in 24.5 minutes.

Minnesota Lynx 
After the 2003 WNBA season, the Cleveland Rockers decided to fold, a dispersal draft was held. The Minnesota Lynx selected Darling with their seventh pick.
 
During the 2004 WNBA season, Darling played in 33 games and started in the last 22 games of the regular season for the Lynx averaging 4.2 points, 3.5 assists and 2.0 rebounds in 21.4 minutes. Helping Minnesota tie the Seattle Storm for 3rd seed in the Western Conference.

Charlotte Sting 
After only one season with the Lynx, Darling was traded by Minnesota along with the Lynx's second-round pick (24th overall) in the 2005 WNBA Draft to the Charlotte Sting in exchange for the Sting's second-round pick (17th overall) in the 2005 WNBA Draft.

During the 2005 WNBA season, Darling played 31 games for Charlotte, starting the last 11, as a starter Darling, averaged 7.0 points and 4.5 assists in 31.0 minutes, compared to 1.5 points and 1.3 assists in 17.6 minutes off the bench. Missed only one game due to a left hamstring strain.

During the 2006 WNBA season, Darling started all 29 regular season games, averaging 4.7 points, 3.0 assists and 1.13 steals per game. (At 5-foot-6, Darling was the Sting's shortest player -- and three inches taller than her new coach, Charlotte basketball icon Muggsy Bogues, who was 5'3".)

San Antonio Silver Stars 
After a disappointing last-place performance and poor attendance for the Sting, the team folded and a dispersal draft was held. The San Antonio Silver Stars selected Darling with their fourth pick. Reuniting Darling with Coach Dan Hughes who drafted her from Penn state for the Cleveland Rockers in 2000.

During the 2007 WNBA season, Darling started 19 regular-season games and appeared in 33 recordings 103 assists and 45 steals. On August 7  Darling earned her 1,000th career point in a game against the Washington Mystics.

Off the court 
Darling has been very active in every community for which she plays so much so that she received the WNBA Community Assistant Award in 2003 for her participation in the community. Darling has also served as a national spokesperson for the March of Dimes. Darling has recently published her first children's book entitled Hide 'n Seek Mondays. The book is the first in a series of seven. Helen is a mother of three, triplets, sons JaJuan and Jalen and daughter Neveah.

WNBA career statistics

Regular season

|-
| align="left"| 2000
| align="left"| Cleveland
| 32 || 0 || 17.3 || .313 || .342 || .738 || 2.0 || 2.0 || 1.2 || 0.2 || 2.1 || 4.8
|-
| align="left"| 2001
| align="left"| Cleveland
| 32 || 32 || 24.3 || .355 || .329 || .764 || 2.4 || 3.4 || 1.1 || 0.1 || 2.2 || 6.1
|-
| align="left"| 2003
| align="left"| Cleveland
| 34 || 34 || 24.5 || .308 || .324 || .732 || 2.6 || 3.8 || 1.1 || 0.2'' || 2.2 || 4.1
|-
| align="left"| 2004
| align="left"| Minnesota
| 33 || 22 || 21.4 || .331 || .218 || .667 || 2.0 || 3.5 || 0.9 || 0.1 || 2.2 || 4.2
|-
| align="left"| 2005
| align="left"| Charlotte
| 31 || 11 || 19.4 || .307 || .313 || .741 || 1.5 || 2.7 || 1.3 || 0.0 || 1.6 || 3.5
|-
| align="left"| 2006
| align="left"| Charlotte
| 29 || 29 || 21.2 || .370 || .383 || .691 || 2.0 || 2.8 || 1.2 || 0.1 || 2.5 || 5.4
|-
| align="left"| 2007
| align="left"| San Antonio
| 33 || 19 || 20.7 || .383 || .366 || .771 || 2.1 || 3.1 || 1.4 || 0.0 || 1.6 || 4.1
|-
| align="left"| 2008
| align="left"| San Antonio
| 31 || 14 || 18.7 || .268 || .200 || .789 || 2.4 || 1.7 || 1.1 || 0.1 || 1.5 || 3.5
|-
| align="left"| 2009
| align="left"| San Antonio
| 34 || 13 || 18.9 || .248 || .295 || .673 || 1.8 || 2.9 || 0.9 || 0.1 || 1.2 || 3.1
|-
| align="left"| 2010
| align="left"| San Antonio
| 33 || 1 || 11.8 || .300 || .273 || .647 || 1.0 || 1.4 || 0.6 || 0.0 || 1.0 || 1.9
|-
| align="left" | Career
| align="left" | 10 years, 4 teams
| 322 || 175 || 19.8 || .322 || .302 || .721 || 2.0 || 2.8 || 1.1 || 0.1 || 1.8 || 4.1

Playoffs

|-
| align="left"| 2000
| align="left"| Cleveland
| 6 || 0 || 17.7 || .321 || .385 || .714 || 3.3 || 2.2 || 1.2 || 0.0 || 1.0 || 5.5
|-
| align="left"| 2001
| align="left"| Cleveland
| 3 || 3 || 26.7 || .185 || .333 || .833 || 3.7 || 6.3 || 2.3 || 0.3 || 1.7 || 6.0
|-
| align="left"| 2003
| align="left"| Cleveland
| 3 || 3 || 27.7 || .154 || .125 || 1.000 || 4.0 || 4.3 || 2.0 || 0.0 || 3.3 || 3.0
|-
| align="left"| 2004
| align="left"| Minnesota
| 2 || 2 || 22.0 || .222 || .667 || .500 || 1.5 || 1.5 || 1.5 || 0.0 || 5.5 || 3.5
|-
| align="left"| 2007
| align="left"| San Antonio
| 5 || 5 || 24.2 || .467 || .529 || .833 || 3.4 || 3.8 || 1.2 || 0.0 || 2.6 || 8.4|-
| align="left"| 2008
| align="left"| San Antonio
| 6 || 0 || 8.8 || .385 || .286 || .000 || 1.2 || 0.8 || 0.5 || 0.0 || 1.2 || 2.0
|-
| align="left"| 2009
| align="left"| San Antonio
| 3 || 0 || 11.3 || .200 || .000 || .500 || 1.3 || 1.0 || 0.3 || 0.0 || 0.3 || 1.3
|-
| align="left"| 2010
| align="left"| San Antonio
| 2 || 0 || 7.0 || .500''' || .000 || .000 || 0.5 || 0.0 || 0.0 || 0.0|| 1.0 || 1.0
|-
| align="left" | Career
| align="left" | 8 years, 3 teams
| 30 || 13 || 17.8 || .307 || .386 || .750 || 2.5 || 2.5 || 1.1 || 0.0 || 1.8 ||  4.2

Notes

External links 
Silver Star Re-sign Helen Darling

1978 births
Living people
All-American college women's basketball players
American women's basketball players
Basketball players from Columbus, Ohio
Charlotte Sting players
Cleveland Rockers players
Minnesota Lynx players
Penn State Lady Lions basketball players
Point guards
San Antonio Stars players
Universiade gold medalists for the United States
Universiade medalists in basketball
United States women's national basketball team players